Rosalie Maria Emslie (née Watson), sometime Mrs. A. E. Emslie (12 March 1854 – 8 January 1932) was a British painter of miniature portraits.

Emslie was born in London and became proficient at watercolour painting and attended the Royal Academy Schools. She worked in London where she met and married her husband, the painter Alfred Edward Emslie. She exhibited at the Royal Academy, the New Water-Colour Society and the Salon de la Société Nationale from 1888 to 1912. Her miniatures are in various collections, most notably the Victoria and Albert Museum that holds her self-portrait, and the Royal Society of Miniature Painters, Sculptors & Gravers.

Emslie died in Otford, Kent. Her daughter, Rosalie Emslie,  also became a painter.

References

External links

Emslie, R. M. (Mrs. A. E.), Otford, Sevenoaks--1396, 1397, 1398, 1399, 1400, 1401, 1402 listed in the catalog of the exhibition of The Exhibition of the Royal Academy of Arts MDCCCC : the one hundred and thirty-second, 1900
Three works mentioned by Rosalie M. Emslie, in the "Watercolour Room" of the exhibition of the Royal Academy of Arts, 1911

1854 births
1932 deaths
19th-century English women artists
20th-century English women artists
Alumni of the Royal Academy Schools
Artists from London
English women painters
People from Otford